The 2003 New England 300 was a NASCAR Winston Cup Series race held on July 20, 2003, at New Hampshire International Speedway, in Loudon, New Hampshire. Contested over 300 laps on the  speedway, it was the 19th race of the 2003 NASCAR Winston Cup Series season. Jimmie Johnson of Hendrick Motorsports won the race.

Background
New Hampshire International Speedway is a  oval speedway located in Loudon, New Hampshire which has hosted NASCAR racing annually since the early 1990s, as well as an IndyCar weekend and the oldest motorcycle race in North America, the Loudon Classic.  Nicknamed "The Magic Mile", the speedway is often converted into a  road course, which includes much of the oval. The track was originally the site of Bryar Motorsports Park before being purchased and redeveloped by Bob Bahre. The track is currently one of eight major NASCAR tracks owned and operated by Speedway Motorsports.

Top 10 results

Race Statistics
 Time of race: 3:16:29
 Average Speed: 
 Pole Speed: no time trials
 Cautions: 12 for 63 laps
 Margin of Victory: 1.582 sec
 Lead changes: 14
 Percent of race run under caution: 21%         
 Average green flag run: 18.2 laps

References

New England 300
New England 300
NASCAR races at New Hampshire Motor Speedway
July 2003 sports events in the United States